is a Japanese manga series written and illustrated by Ato Sakurai. It was serialized in Shogakukan's shōnen manga magazine Weekly Shōnen Sunday from July 2008 to October 2009, and later on Club Sunday from November 2009 to March 2010. Its chapters were collected in nine tankōbon volumes.

Story
Once upon a time, artists were able to use their special skills freely, until seven years ago with a group of artists began using souls as raw materials for their work. Now society lives in fear of artists as a young man named Acro Hanbakka travels to the capital city to ply his trade as a sculptor and to realize his dream of becoming a great artist.

Publication
Written and illustrated by Ato Sakurai, Artist Acro was serialized in Shogakukan's Weekly Shōnen Sunday from July 2, 2008, to October 31, 2009. It was transferred to Shogakukan's online magazine Club Sunday on November 3, 2009, and finished on March 16, 2010. Shogakukan collected its chapters in nine tankōbon volumes, published from January 16, 2009, and May 18, 2010.

Volume list

Notes

References

External links
 Artist Acro at Web Sunday 
 

Shogakukan manga
Shōnen manga